Coppley Apparel Group manufactured a menswear line of suits, sport coats and trousers called the Coppley Collection from 1998 to 2008. It was owned by Hartmax Corporation. In 2008, Hartmax claimed bankruptcy and sold Coppley Apparel Group to HMX Canada Acquisition Corp in 2009. HMX Canada Acquisition Corp renamed Coppley Apparel Group to Coppley Corp.

History
In 1883, G.C. Coppley, E. Finch Noyes and James Randall formed a menswear clothing company called Coppley, Noyes & Randall Ltd after purchasing John Calder & Co, a wholesale clothing company. Coppley Noyes & Randall Ltd was located at 56 York Boulevard, Hamilton, Ontario in a building called the Commercial Block.  The Commercial Block "is the finest surviving pre-confederation"  stone building in the City of Hamilton.

In 1950, Max Enkin purchased Coppley, Noyes & Randall Ltd and kept it as a menswear clothing company.  In 1998, Coppley, Noyes & Randall Ltd was purchased by Hartmarx Corporation who renamed the company to Coppley Apparel Group Limited. Ten years following the acquisition, Hartmarx Corporation went bankrupt and sold Coppley Apparel Group Limited to HMX Canada Acquisition Corp who later renamed the company Coppley Corp in 2009.

References 

Clothing companies of Canada
Companies based in Hamilton, Ontario